"There Was Jesus" is a song written by Christian rock musician Zach Williams, Jonathan Smith, and country music songwriter Casey Beathard. A Williams duet with country legend Dolly Parton, it was released on October 3, 2019, as the second single from his album, Rescue Story. It won a Grammy Award for Best Contemporary Christian Music Performance/Song at the 2021 Grammy Awards. "There Was Jesus" received nominations for the GMA Dove Award Song of the Year and Pop/Contemporary Recorded Song of the Year at the 2021 GMA Dove Awards.

Background
Williams wrote "There Was Jesus" with Casey Beathard and Jonathan Smith, who also produced the song. About the song's inspiration, Williams said the song is about "looking back at 20 years ago when I had no idea that God was in the moment, that He was even with me through some of the hard things that have gone on in my life. Now I can see that He had His hand in everything I was doing." He said he knew the moment they finished writing the song he wanted to see if Parton would consider recording it with him. Williams's team reached out to Parton's manager. When Parton heard the song she loved it. Arrangements were made for the duo to meet in the studio a few weeks later to record it. In a press release Williams recalled, "It was a really cool moment, just to have the privilege to record a song with Dolly Parton. Working with Dolly was a true honor. She has a way of making you feel like you are the only person in the room. She is so down-to-earth and genuine, and I can't wait for people to hear that in the song."

Live performances
Williams and Parton performed the song live for the first time at the 53rd Annual CMA Awards on November 13, 2019.

Accolades

Charts

Weekly charts

Year-end charts

Certifications

References

Dolly Parton songs
2019 songs
Christian rock songs